The North American Formula 1000 Championship is a motor racing series based on SCCA's open wheel Formula 1000 rules. It was founded in 2017 after the US Formula 1000 Championship ended in 2016. It serves somewhat as a successor to all the previous F1000 championships as all of those who were involved in its inception were part of either organizing or participating in all of the previous F1000 championships.

Series

The North American Formula 1000 Championship began in 2017 as a series running within the SCCA Formula B (FB) class at SCCA Majors races at select venues located primarily in the Eastern United States. The first North American Formula 1000 Championship race was held at Road Atlanta in March 2017. It continued with this format in 2018 until the SCCA merged the Formula B (FB) class into its Formula Atlantic (FA) class in 2019. 

Beginning in 2019 The North American Formula 1000 Championship has run the series with Formula Race Promotions https://www.formularacepromotions.com/. It has continued to run with Formula Race Promotions in both 2020 and 2021.

History

Formula 1000 in the SCCA

The Sport Car Club of America (SCCA) created the Formula 1000 (otherwise known as FB or Formula B) class in 2007 as part of its Club Racing program. The SCCA immediately granted the class national status, allowing Formula 1000 to participate in all national club races with the exception the SCCA National Championship Runoffs. 
 
To be able to compete as a class (FB) in the SCCA National Championship Runoffs, the class was required to have an average of 2.5 entries per national race. The class achieved that in 2009 and was invited to the National Championship Runoffs for the first time in 2010.

In May 2018 the SCCA suddenly and without warning or notice to the SCCA membership came out with a Car Count Criteria which specified how many Major (national) race entries each racing car class needed to maintain its National Championship Runoffs status. This Car Count Criteria was also backdated by more than a year to Jan 2017. As most F1000 (FB) drivers were competing in SCCA regional race events (which at the time was a route to the National Runoffs) as part of the North American F1000 Championship  there was no opportunity to raise the Major race entry numbers in time by the end of 2018 to maintain SCCA National Runoffs status for F1000 (FB). As a result of this F1000 (FB) lost its National Runoffs status and many F1000 (FB) competitors decided to leave SCCA club racing entirely and compete with the North American F1000 Championship after it left SCCA Club Racing to compete as part of the Formula Race Promotions group. The last year F1000 (FB) competed as a class at the SCCA National Championship was in 2019 when 1 (one) car showed up. 

F1000 (FB) was later merged into the Formula Atlantic (FA) class in 2020. F1000 currently runs in the SCCA FA class under the F1000 rules as stated in the December 2019 SCCA GCR (General Competition Rules). 

Formula 1000 Race Series  

In 2007, the Formula 1000 National Championship was created to increase interest in the class and build entries. In 2007 and 2008, the Formula 10000 National Championship was a single race, held during American Road Race of Champions at Road Atlanta. Justin Pritchard won the race both years in a Piper chassis.

In 2009, the Formula 1000 National Championship became more of a national championship in that it counted nationwide competitor participation in SCCA races as part of its series. This meant that all drivers throughout the US that scored points at their respective SCCA races could count those points toward the season-long Formula 1000 National championship. It used points earned in those events to determine an overall champion.  Glenn Cooper won the first Formula 1000 National Championship in 2009.

In 2010, the West Coast-based F1000 Pro Series was formed with the participation of several F1000 manufacturers to help promote F1000 racing in the Western US. It was run in a similar manner to the F1000 National Championship as a series within a series, separate from SCCA FB but counting races within the SCCA as part of its series. It also organized and managed most of their events trackside at the actual venues, which included having their own separate podium and prize giving for F1000 competitors at each event that was separate from the SCCA. The first year consisted of a format of 15 selected races where drivers counted points earned from 10 of those races towards a drivers championship. It also had a Manufacturer's Cup for F1000 constructors and an end-of-season trophy for the top-scoring manufacturer. The series' first race was held at Phoenix Raceway in March 2010 and was won by Phil DeLao in a Phoenix Raceworks F1000. The Manufacturer's Cup in 2010 was won by Stohr Cars, who would go on to win the cup in 2011 and 2012 as well.

For 2011 the format was changed to ten races over five weekends at selected events (at SCCA national races) with points scored in all races. The series had a separate trophy and prize giving ceremony at every event. This format would be continued in 2012. 

The US Formula 1000 Championship was created in 2013 when the F1000 Pro Series and the Formula 1000 National Championship joined to create a new national racing series for Formula 1000 cars. The series consisted of three championships in one. The US Formula 1000 Championship West, The US Formula 1000 Championship East, and an overall US Formula 1000 Championship.

The format for the US Formula 1000 championship called for each of the championship series (East and West) to run an equal number of events independently of each other as part of the SCCA SafeRacer national racing program, with points to be awarded based on in-class finishing positions at each event. Each series would crown a separate US Formula 1000 East and US Formula 1000 West Champion with an overall US Formula 1000 Champion decided at the SCCA National Runoffs. As in previous years it was run as a series within a series at SCCA Majors (national race) events. 

The series first race was held as a joint East–West shootout event at the Circuit of the Americas in Austin, Texas on March 9, 2013, and was won by Lawrence Loshak in a JDR F1000. It was followed by a second race the next day which was won by Jose Gerardo in a Stohr. The US Formula 1000 Championship also conducted the first standing start ever in SCCA Club Racing in a race at Portland Raceway in July 2014 when it was granted its own run group during the event by the organizers. It was followed by two other standing starts, one later in the year at Pacific Raceway and another the following year at Road Atlanta. The US Formula 1000 Championship continued to run until the end of 2016.

Cars
 
 

The SCCA General Competition Rules define the Formula 1000 car as follows: "A formula for purpose built, open-wheel, open cockpit racing cars. F1000
allows converted Formula Continental, Formula 2000, Formula F, and
purpose-built motorcycle-powered tube frame chassis."

With more than 13 manufacturers, Formula 1000 boast more manufacturers than other open-wheel formula class in the world. Manufacturers build purpose-built Formula 1000 cars as a rolling chassis or provide kits for converting Formula 2000 (F2000) cars into F1000. Most provide cars race ready complete with engine and data system package. Purpose-built manufacturers include Stohr, Firman, Phoenix, JDR, Astra, Speads, Philadelphia, Edge, and Elan. Manufacturers that convert existing Formula 2000 cars include Piper, Citation, and Novak, who convert the Van Dieman. Others provide modified upgrade designs for existing purpose built cars.

Formula 1000 is also one of the few open-wheel racing classes that allow paddle shifters. There are multiple manufacturers of paddle shifters in Formula 1000.

It is possible to use any 4-cycle motorcycle-based 1000 cc engine. Most popular is the Suzuki GSXR engine. But there are also cars with Honda, Kawasaki, BMW or Yamaha engine.

Formula 1000 Champions

North American Formula 1000 Champions

Previous Formula 1000 Champions
NOTE: 2019 SCCA National Championship Runoffs had only one entry as many boycotted the SCCA after they merged FB into FA class

US Formula 1000 Champions

2013 US Formula 1000 Championship Race Winners

2014 US Formula 1000 Championship Race Winners

Note: 2014 saw the first standing starts in SCCA club racing when the US Formula 1000 Championship conducted standing starts at Pacific and Portland.

See also
2022 North American Formula 1000 Championship
2021 North American Formula 1000 Championship

References

External links
 Official website

Motorsport in the United States
Sports Car Club of America